Thelidiopsis is a genus of fungi in the family Verrucariaceae.

References

Verrucariales
Lichen genera
Taxa named by Edvard August Vainio
Taxa described in 1921